Archaeosynthemis orientalis is a species of dragonfly of the family Synthemistidae,
commonly known as the eastern brown tigertail. 
It is a medium-sized dragonfly with reddish-brown and yellow markings.
It inhabits boggy creeks and swamps in eastern Australia

Archaeosynthemis orientalis appears similar to Archaeosynthemis occidentalis found in Western Australia.

Gallery

See also
 List of Odonata species of Australia

References

Synthemistidae
Odonata of Australia
Endemic fauna of Australia
Taxa named by Robert John Tillyard
Insects described in 1910